The 2012 Canadian Tour season ran from June 7 to September 9 and consisted of eight official tournaments. This was the 43rd season of the Canadian Professional Golf Tour, and the last under the "Canadian Tour" name. On October 18, the Canadian Tour and the U.S. PGA Tour announced that they had reached an agreement by which the PGA Tour would take over the Canadian circuit. On November 1, the Canadian circuit was officially renamed PGA Tour Canada.

Although the 2011 season started with three events in Latin America (March to May), these events were canceled in 2012 due to security concerns. Canadian player Matt Hill won the Order of Merit in 2012.

Schedule
The following table lists official events during the 2012 season.

Order of Merit
The Order of Merit was based on prize money won during the season, calculated in Canadian dollars.

References

External links
Official Site of the Canadian Professional Golf Tour

PGA Tour Canada
Canadian Tour